Julian Stallabrass is a British art historian, photographer and curator. He was educated at Leighton Park School and New College, Oxford University where he studied PPE (Philosophy, Politics, and Economics).  A Marxist, he has written extensively on contemporary art (including internet art), photography and the history of twentieth-century British art.

Life and work
Stallabrass was previously a professor at the Courtauld Institute of Art, University of London. He left the Courtauld in 2022. 

He is on the editorial board of the New Left Review.

He curated the exhibition Art and Money Online at Tate Britain, London in 2001. In 2008 he selected the Brighton Photo Biennial and from the catalogue of which he edited the book Memory of Fire: Images of War and The War of Images (2013)

Stallabrass was highly critical of the Young British Artists movement, and their works and influence was the subject of his 1999 study High Art Lite, a term he coined as a disparaging synonym to the pervasive YBA acronym:"As the art market revived [in the early- to mid- 1990s] and success beckoned, the new art became more evidently two-faced, looking still to the mass media and a broad audience but also to the particular concerns of the narrow world of art-buyers and dealers. To please both was not an easy task. Could the artists face both ways at once, and take both sets of viewers seriously? That split in attention, I shall argue, led to a wide public being successfully courted but not seriously addressed. It has left a large audience for high art lite intrigued but unsatisfied, puzzled at the work's meaning and wanting explanations that are never vouchsafed: the aim of this book is to suggest the direction some of those answers might take and to do so in a style that is as accessible as the art it examines."

Publications

Publications by Stallabrass
Gargantua: Manufactured Mass Culture. London: Verso, 1996. .
High Art Lite. London: Verso, 1999. . London: Verso, 2001. .
High Art Lite: The Rise and Fall of Young British Art (Revised and Expanded edition). London: Verso, 2006. .
Paris Pictured. New York: Abrams, 2002. .
Internet Art: The Online Clash of Culture and Commerce. London: Tate, 2003. .
Art Incorporated (2004), republished as Contemporary Art: A Very Short Introduction. Oxford: Oxford University, 2006. .
Memory of Fire: Images of War and The War of Images. Brighton: Photoworks, 2013. .
Documentary. Documents of Contemporary Art series. London: Whitechapel Gallery; Cambridge, MA: MIT Press, 2013. . Edited by Stallabrass, with contributions by James Agee, Ariella Azoulay, Walter Benjamin, Adam Broomberg & Oliver Chanarin, Judith Butler, Georges Didi-Huberman, John Grierson, David Levi Strauss, Elizabeth McCausland, Carl Plantinga, Jacques Rancière, Martha Rosler, Jean-Paul Sartre, Allan Sekula, W. Eugene Smith, Susan Sontag, Hito Steyerl and Trinh T. Minh-ha.

Publications with contributions by Stallabrass
Everything was Moving: Photography from the 60s and 70s. London: Barbican Art Gallery, 2012. . Edited by Kate Bush and Gerry Badger. Stallabrass contributes an essay ("Rather a hawk?: the photography of Larry Burrows").

References

External links
Essays and articles by Stallabrass at Courtauld Institute of Art
Review of High Art Lite (Verso, 2nd edition 2006) by Stewart Home

Year of birth missing (living people)
Living people
British art historians
Academics of the Courtauld Institute of Art
British art critics
Historians of photography